The Lesgaft National State University of Physical Education, Sport and Health is a university in St. Petersburg, Russia, named after Peter Lesgaft.

History 
Its history started from 1896, when Peter Lesgaft founded a training program for PE teachers. The university now offers 15 bachelor degrees including Bachelor of Physical Culture, Bachelor of Adapted physical education among others. It provides 7 courses at Masters level and 14 courses at PhD levels. The institution was among first in Russia to introduce a Bachelor of Nursing course.

It consists of following colleges:

 Institute of Adaptive Physical Culture 
 Institute of Sports Facilities and Industries
 Institute of Economics and Social Technology
 Institute of International sports Programs
 Institute of Health and Sports Medicine

and the following faculties:

 Faculty Summer Olympic Sports
 Faculty of Winter Olympic Sports
 Faculty of non-Olympic sports
 Faculty of martial arts
 Faculty of Economics, Management and Law
 Faculty individual educational and sports technology
 Faculty of Basic Training
 Faculty profiled training
 Faculty training and retraining
 Faculty training of the teaching staff (postgraduate and doctoral studies)
 Faculty teaching and professional practice
 Faculty of Social Science and Humanities
 Preparatory Faculty

It is also the publisher of the magazine Scientific notes University Lesgaft and the newspaper Lesgaftovets ("For physical training cadres").

Sports teams
A team representing this university was the runner-up for the first edition of the Soviet Cup in bandy in 1937.

References

External links
 Lesgaft National State University

Sports academies
 
1896 establishments in the Russian Empire
Higher educational institutions of physical culture and sports in Russia
National Institutes of Sport
Sports schools
Sports universities and colleges